Science Channel (often simply branded as Science; abbreviated to SCI) is an American pay television channel owned by Warner Bros. Discovery. The channel features programming focusing on science related to wilderness survival, engineering,  manufacturing, technology, space, space exploration, ufology and prehistory.

As of February 2015, Science is available to approximately 75.5 million pay television households (64.8% of households with at least one television set) in the United States.

History
In November 1994, Discovery Networks announced plans for four digital channels set to launch in 1996. Discovery originally named the network under the working title Quark!; this was changed before its launch to the Discovery Science Network. Discovery Science launched in October 1996 as part of the simultaneous rollout of the new channel suite (alongside Discovery Home & Leisure, Discovery Kids and Discovery Civilization). In 2007, adult shows began airing around the clock weekdays, while younger children shows began airing around the clock weeknights.

The channel has undergone various rebrandings throughout its history. Its name was first modified to the Discovery Science Channel in 1998, and then was renamed The Science Channel in 2002, as the first network in the Discovery Networks digital suite to drop the "Discovery" brand from its name (however, international versions of the channel continue to use the "Discovery Science" name). The channel later shortened its name to just Science Channel in 2007 as part of a rebrand that included the introduction of a new logo based on the periodic table; in 2011, the network rebranded as simply Science, introducing a new logo and graphics package designed by Imaginary Forces. In 2008, the channel changed its programming to adult-oriented, and removing all shows for elementary children.

On December 23, 2016, Discovery Communications debuted a new logo for Science after five years. This rebrand was done by Sibling Rivalry, a New York-based design agency.

High definition
The channel launched a high-definition simulcast feed that broadcasts in 1080i; it was launched on September 1, 2009, along with Discovery Channel HD, TLC HD and Animal Planet HD.

Programming

Science Channel broadcasts a number of science-related television series originally produced by or aired on Discovery Channel, such as Beyond Tomorrow, among others. Discovery Communications has also produced a few programs specifically for Science, such as MegaScience and What The Ancients Knew. Programs from other Discovery Networks channels, PBS and the BBC are either regularly or occasionally aired on the network. Television series produced in the 1990s, such as Discover Magazine and Understanding, are carried on the network's weekday schedule. The Science Channel also broadcasts programs such as Moments of Impact and An Idiot Abroad. The channel has infrequently added reruns of several science fiction series like Firefly, Helix and Fringe to its schedule.

International
There are international versions of Science in Southeast Asia, Europe, France, United Kingdom, Italy, India, Sweden, Turkey, Canada, Latin America and Australia. The channels are branded Discovery Science and do not broadcast all of the same shows as the US channel.

See also
 List of documentary channels
 Discovery Science (disambiguation)#TV channels

References

External links
Science Channel

 
Warner Bros. Discovery networks
English-language television stations in the United States
Television channels and stations established in 1996